The Aberystwyth & District Football League (known as the Cynghrair Cambrian Tyres Aberystwyth League) is a football league in Mid Wales, sitting at the fifth level of the Welsh football league system.

The league hosts several cup competitions: J. Emrys Morgan Cup, Dai 'Dynamo' Davies Cup, League Cup, Len & Julie Newman Memorial Trophy, Second Division Trophy and Consolation Cup.

Teams promoted from Division One can enter the Mid Wales League if standards and facilities fell into line with the regulations of the Mid Wales League.

Member clubs for the 2022–23 season

Division One

Aberdyfi (resigned September 2022)  
Aberystwyth University reserves 
Bont 
Borth United
Corris United
Llanilar reserves
Padarn United 
Penparcau reserves
Talybont reserves
Tregaron Turfs reserves

League champions - Top division
Information sourced from the Welsh Soccer Archive unless referenced.

1930s

1934–35: Aberayron
1935–36: Trefechain

1940s

1946–47: Season competition declared void
1947–48: Pontrhydfendigaid & District (Bont )
1948–49: Aberystwyth Rovers
1949-50: Bont

1950s

1950–51: Aberayron
1951–52: Trefechain
1952–53: Trefechain
1953–54: Aberystwyth Rovers
1954–55: Aberayron
1955–56: Tregaron Turfs
1956–57: University College of Wales reserves
1957–58: YMCA
1958–59: University College of Wales reserves
1959–60: Dewi Stars

1960s

1960–61: Dewi Stars
1961–62: University College of Wales reserves
1962–63: University College of Wales reserves 
1963–64: University College of Wales reserves
1964–65: Bont 
1965–66: Penparcau	
1966–67: Bont
1967–68: Bont
1968–69: Penparcau
1969–70: Bont

1970s

1970–71: Bont 
1971–72: CPD Penrhyncoch
1972–73: Phoenix
1973–74: Llanilar
1974–75: CPD Penrhyncoch
1975–76: CPD Penrhyncoch
1976–77: CPD Penrhyncoch
1977–78: CPD Penrhyncoch
1978–79: Aber Athletics Club
1979–80: Bryncrug

1980s

1980–81: Dolgellau Athletic
1981–82: Barmouth & Dyffryn United
1982–83: Bow Street
1983–84: Aberystwyth Town reserves
1984–85: Bryncrug
1985–86: Penparcau	
1986–87: Bryncrug
1987–88: Padarn United
1988–89: Penparcau	
1989–90: Penparcau

1990s

1990–91: Penparcau
1991–92: Machynlleth
1992–93: Bow Street	
1993–94: U. W. A.
1994–95: Bow Street
1995–96: Bow Street
1996–97: Padarn United	
1997–98: CPD Penrhyncoch reserves
1998–99: CPD Penrhyncoch reserves
1999–2000: Penparcau

2000s

2000–01: League not completed - Foot & Mouth outbreak 
2001–02: Bow Street	
2002–03: Bow Street	
2003–04: Bow Street	
2004–05: Penparcau	
2005–06: CPD Penrhyncoch reserves
2006–07: Bow Street	
2007–08: Penparcau
2008–09: Dolgellau Athletic 'A'
2009–10: Bont

2010s

2010–11: Aberdyfi
2011–12: CPD Penrhyncoch reserves
2012–13: Tregaron Turfs
2013–14: Borth United
2014–15: Talybont
2015–16: Dolgellau Athletic
2016–17: Bont 
2017–18: Bow Street reserves
2018–19: Penparcau  
2019–20: Tregaron Turfs

2020s

2020–21: Season cancelled due to Coronavirus pandemic
2021–22: Llanilar

Number of titles by winning clubs

Penparcau – 11 titles
CPD Penrhyncoch – 10 titles
Bow Street – 9 titles
Bont – 7 titles
U. W. A./ University College of Wales – 6 titles
Aberayron  – 3 titles
Bryncrug – 3 titles
Dolgellau Athletic – 3 titles
Trefechain – 3 titles
Tregaron Turfs – 3 titles
Dewi Stars– 2 titles
Llanilar  – 1 titles
Padarn United – 2 titles
Aber Athletics Club – 1 title
Aberdyfi – 1 title
Aberystwyth Rovers – 1 title
Aberystwyth Town reserves – 1 title
Barmouth & Dyffryn United – 1 title
Borth United  – 1 title
Machynlleth – 1 title
Phoenix – 1 title
Talybont – 1 title
YMCA – 1 title

See also
Football in Wales
List of football clubs in Wales

External links
League website

References

5
1934 establishments in Wales
Sports leagues established in 1934
Fifth level football leagues in Europe